Silene sytnikii is a species of flowering plant in the family Caryophyllaceae, native to Ukraine. Known from only a few locales along the Southern Bug river, it is very similar to Silene frivaldskyana.

References

sytnikii
Endemic flora of Ukraine
Plants described in 1996